The 1990 480 km of Donington was the seventh round of the 1990 World Sportscar Championship season, taking place at Donington Park, United Kingdom.  It took place on September 2, 1990.

Official results
Class winners in bold.  Cars failing to complete 75% of the winner's distance marked as Not Classified (NC).

† - #3 and #4 Silk Cut Jaguars both were disqualified for using more than their allowed amount of fuel.

Statistics
 Pole Position - #1 Team Sauber Mercedes - 1:16.952
 Fastest Lap - #1 Team Sauber Mercedes - 1:23.597
 Average Speed - 166.64 km/h

External links
 WSPR-Racing - 1990 Donington results

Donington
6 Hours of Donington
Donington